Chlorodiloma crinita is a species of sea snail, a marine gastropod mollusk in the family Trochidae, the top snails.

Description
The shell grows to a length of 15 mm. The globose-conic shell is narrowly perforate, solid, and light cinereous. It is longitudinally marked with numerous narrow regularly spaced olive lines. The first whorls are bright orange colored. The spire  is conic and eroded. The sutures are linear and impressed. The five whorls are convex and spirally grooved. These grooves are shallow, about 5 on the penultimate whorl. The aperture is oblique. The lip is smooth and thickened within. The columella is not very thick. It is 
arcuate, white edged and obtusely dentate below. The umbilico-columellar area is bright green.

Distribution
This marine species occurs off West Australia.

References

 Philippi, R.A. 1852. Trochidae. pp. 233–248 in Küster, H.C. (ed). Systematisches Conchylien-Cabinet von Martini und Chemnitz. Nürnberg : Bauer & Raspe Vol. 2
 Fischer, P. 1877. Genres Calcar, Trochus, Xenophora, Tectarius et Risella. pp. 115–240 in Keiner, L.C. (ed.). Spécies general et iconographie des coquilles vivantes. Paris : J.B. Baillière Vol. 11
 Thiele, J. 1930. Gastropoda und Bivalvia. pp. 561–596 in Michaelsen, W. & Hartmayer, R. (eds). Die Fauna Südwest-Australiens. Jena : Gustav Fischer Vol. 5.
 Wilson, B. 1993. Australian Marine Shells. Prosobranch Gastropods. Kallaroo, Western Australia : Odyssey Publishing Vol. 1 408 pp.

External links
 To Encyclopedia of Life
 To GenBank (2 nucleotides; 0 proteins)
 To World Register of Marine Species

crinita
Gastropods of Australia
Gastropods described in 1849